St Gall's Gaelic Athletic Club is a sports club based in Belfast, County Antrim, Northern Ireland. It competes in the Antrim leagues and championships of the Gaelic Athletic Association, in Gaelic football and ladies' Gaelic football.

Football
In 2010, they won the All-Ireland Senior Club Football Championship, their first title by defeating Kilmurry Ibrickane of Clare in the final at Croke Park. Lenny Harbinson, who went on to manage Antrim, was manager of St Gall's at the time.

Notable players

Senior inter-county players

Men's Gaelic football
 Antrim
 CJ McGourty
 Kevin McGourty
 Cavan
 Rory Gallagher
 Fermanagh
 Rory Gallagher

Hurling
 Antrim
 CJ McGourty

Ladies' Gaelic football
 Antrim
 Michelle Drayne

Others
 netball internationals
 Michelle Drayne

Football Titles

 Antrim Senior Football Championship (19) 
 1933, 1982, 1983, 1987, 1990, 1993, 2001, 2002, 2003, 2004, 2005, 2007, 2008, 2009, 2010, 2011, 2012, 2013, 2014
 Ulster Senior Club Football Championship (3)
 1982, 2005, 2009
 All-Ireland Senior Club Football Championship (1)
 2010

Hurling Titles
 Antrim Intermediate Hurling Championship (3)
 1997, 2009, 2019
 Ulster Intermediate Club Hurling Championship (2)
 2009, 2019
 All-Ireland Intermediate Club Hurling Championship
 Runners-up 2010

Ladies' Football Titles

 Antrim Senior Ladies Football Championship (1)
 2011
 Ulster Intermediate Ladies Football Championship (1)
 2010
 Antrim Intermediate Ladies Football Championship (1)
 2010

References

External links
 St Gall's club website
 Antrim GAA website

Gaelic games clubs in County Antrim
Hurling clubs in County Antrim
Sports clubs in Belfast